Austrogomphus mouldsorum, also known as Austrogomphus (Austrogomphus) mouldsorum, is a species of dragonfly of the family Gomphidae, 
commonly known as the Kimberley hunter. 
It is only known from one location, in the Kimberley region of Western Australia.

Austrogomphus mouldsorum is a medium-sized, black and yellow dragonfly.

Gallery

See also
 List of Odonata species of Australia

References

Gomphidae
Odonata of Australia
Insects of Australia
Endemic fauna of Australia
Taxa named by Günther Theischinger
Insects described in 1999